Baas:
An Afrikaans word for boss and Dutch word for supervisor/leader/master, from which the American word "boss" is derived.

Surname
 Balduin Baas (1922–2006), German actor
 David Baas (born 1981), American football center
 Gilberto Keb Baas (born 1977), Mexican boxer
 Heinz Baas (1922–1994), German football player and manager
 Ian Baas (born 1982), American race car driver
 Jan Baas (born 1950), Dutch politician
 Johann Hermann Baas (1838–1909), German medical historian
 Lourens Baas Becking (1895–1963), Dutch botanist and microbiologist
 Maarten Baas (born 1978), Dutch industrial designer
 Pieter Baas (born 1944), Dutch botanist
 Stien Baas-Kaiser (born 1938), Dutch speed skater

See also
 Banking as a service
 Blockchain as a service
 Backend as a service
 May refer to Dutch film Brammetje Baas
 Plural of "baa", see Baa (disambiguation)
 BAAS (disambiguation)
 Bas (disambiguation)

Dutch-language surnames